KAEF-TV (channel 23) is a television station licensed to Arcata, California, United States, serving as the ABC affiliate for the Eureka area. It is owned by Sinclair Broadcast Group alongside two low-power stations: dual CW/MyNetworkTV affiliate KECA-LD (channel 29) and Univision affiliate KEUV-LD (channel 35). Sinclair also provides certain services to Eureka-licensed Fox affiliate KBVU (channel 28) under a local marketing agreement (LMA) with Cunningham Broadcasting; however, Sinclair effectively owns KBVU as the majority of Cunningham's stock is owned by the family of deceased group founder Julian Smith. The stations share studios on Sixth Street in downtown Eureka, while KAEF-TV's transmitter is located along Barry Road southeast of the city.

Although identifying as a separate station in its own right, KAEF is actually considered a semi-satellite of KRCR-TV (channel 7) in Redding–Chico. As such, it clears all network programming as provided through its parent station but airs a separate offering of syndicated programming; there are also separate local newscasts, commercial inserts and legal station identifications. Master control and most internal operations are based at the studios for KRCR-TV and KCVU in Redding.

History
KAEF began broadcasting August 1, 1987, as KREQ, a Fox affiliate owned by Mad River Broadcasting. During this period, the station lost money on a monthly basis, in part because KREQ was, for all intents and purposes, a UHF independent station (at the time, Fox only offered a nightly late night program and weekend prime time programming, and would not air an entire week's worth of programming until 1993) in a small market dominated by two VHF network affiliates, NBC affiliate KIEM-TV (channel 3) and CBS affiliate KVIQ (channel 6).

In June 1988, Mad River put KREQ up for sale; in 1989, it sold the station to California Oregon Broadcasting (COBI), owner of KRCR-TV. COBI already owned two radio stations in Eureka, KFLI (790 AM, now KEJY) and KEKA-FM (101.5), which were sold off as a condition of the purchase of channel 23. Mad River took KREQ off the air, citing financial problems, on April 30, 1989; that October, COBI returned channel 23 to the air as KAEF (Arcata Eureka Fortuna), an ABC affiliate and semi-satellite of KRCR-TV. Prior to 1989, ABC programming was limited to off-hours clearances on KIEM and KVIQ; through KRCR, KAEF still offered some Fox programming in off-hours until KBVU signed on in 1994.

California Oregon Broadcasting sold KAEF, along with KRCR-TV and its other satellite station, KFWU in Fort Bragg (now KQSL in Cloverdale), to Lamco Communications for $11.925 million in 1995. Lamco sold its stations, including KAEF and KRCR, to BlueStone Television in 2004; BlueStone, in turn, was acquired by Bonten Media Group for $230 million in 2007. KAEF added the "-TV" suffix to its call sign on July 1, 2009.

KAEF-TV became a sister station to Fox affiliate KBVU (channel 28) in 2012, after Bonten (via KRCR-TV) took over the sales operation for KBVU in August and the entire station in December through a local marketing agreement with Esteem Broadcasting, which has functioned as a shell corporation for Bonten since 2008.

Disputes with Dish Network
Dish Network and KAEF, via KRCR, had been at odds for quite sometime regarding carriage of the station on the satellite system. KRCR was asking for reimbursement and made their feeling public. As a result, on December 8, 2013, Dish halted carrying KRCR on their system. General manager Andrew Stewart went to the internet at the station's website to share his frustrations with the viewers and called out Dish Network. On January 12, 2014, Dish restored KRCR and KAEF and associated stations to its lineup. On January 17, 2017, KAEF was once again removed from Dish Network's lineup as part of a new dispute. It was returned to Dish at a later date.

Sale to Sinclair
On April 21, 2017, Sinclair Broadcast Group announced its purchase of KAEF-TV as part of its $240 million acquisition of Bonten Media Group; the purchase also gave it control of KBVU, KECA-LD, and KEUV-LP. The sale was completed on September 1.

Programming
KAEF airs much of the same programming as KRCR, sometimes at different times. There are also some programs that only air on KAEF while some are only seen on KRCR, as the stations are in different media markets. Such programs include The Ellen DeGeneres Show, Dr. Phil, Wheel of Fortune, and Jeopardy!.

News operation
KAEF presently broadcasts 15 hours of newscasts each week (with three hours each weekday). KAEF produces five of those hours at its Eureka studios; the morning newscast, Daybreak, is simulcast from KRCR-TV in Redding. There are currently no newscasts on the weekends.

KAEF discontinued its original news operation on February 6, 2001, due to low ratings; ABC 23 News had generally been the third-ranked news operation in the Eureka market. Following the cancellation, the only Eureka-specific news content on the station was a weather segment produced by KRCR-TV. Local news returned to KAEF-TV on November 17, 2014; the news operation also produces a prime time newscast for sister station KBVU.

Technical information

Subchannels
The station's signal is multiplexed:

On August 23, 2011, Disney-ABC Television Group announced that KAEF would carry Live Well Network as part of an affiliation agreement with Bonten Media Group; the network was added to a new third subchannel. Live Well Network was replaced by Movies! on November 18, 2013, only for it to be replaced by Comet on September 1, 2022.

Analog-to-digital conversion
KAEF-TV shut down its analog signal, over UHF channel 23, on June 12, 2009, the official date in which full-power television stations in the United States transitioned from analog to digital broadcasts under federal mandate. The station's digital signal remained on its pre-transition UHF channel 22. Through the use of PSIP, digital television receivers display the station's virtual channel as its former UHF analog channel 23.

Translators

K21OO-D formerly operated under the call sign K51EG, operating on UHF channel 51. In July 2012, K51EG converted to digital under the callsign K51MR-D on channel 50.  K51MR-D moved to RF Channel 21 K21OO-D in October 2018.

References

External links

ABC network affiliates
MeTV affiliates
Movies! affiliates
Sinclair Broadcast Group
AEF-TV
Television channels and stations established in 1987
1987 establishments in California